François Missen (born 1933 in Oran) is a French journalist, winner of the 1974 Albert Londres Prize.

Bibliography 
1983: La Nuit afghane, 
1999: Cuba, Nathan Nature, 
2002: Martinique, Nathan Nature, 
2004: Le Réseau Carlyle : Banquier des guerres américaines, Flammarion, 

External links 
 Connaissez-vous François Missen ? on Mediapart (14 January 2014)
 Francois Missen de la French connection à Guantanamo on La nuit magazine (8 June 2015)
 François Missen et "sa" French (connection) à Marseille on France Inter (29 October 2014)
 François Missen on Babelio
 François Missen on Éditions Archipel
 François Missen : « Avant d’être une base américaine, Guantanamo est une ville » on Le Monde (6 December 2013)

20th-century French journalists
21st-century French journalists
Albert Londres Prize recipients
1933 births
People from Oran
Living people